"Despoilers of the Golden Empire" is a science fiction novelette by American writer Randall Garrett, originally published in Astounding Science Fiction in March 1959 under the pseudonym David Gordon.

The story appears to be about an expedition through space to a planet inhabited by a civilized but technologically backward people, whom the expedition conquer.  However, in the last line it is revealed to be anything but that.

In terms of genre, the story reads like a pulp magazine yarn  mixing space travel and classic swashbuckling themes, to the point where the characters even fight with swords, bringing to mind the adventures of Flash Gordon, or the Barsoom stories of Edgar Rice Burroughs.

Plot summary

An expedition from an imperialistic culture, led by a man hungry for power and riches, and accompanied by an "adept of the Universal Assembly" (a body of men apparently in communion with a higher power) arrives in a series of ships, with some difficulty — the ships land far from their intended destination, being "unsuited to atmospheric navigation" — and encounter the natives.  Though the natives are civilized and capable of mustering armies in great number, their technology is inferior to that of the invaders.  Despite being few in number, by guile and treachery the expedition is led to victory over the natives, culminating in the capture of their priest-god-king.

Time goes by and the leaders consolidate their gains, only to be undone by political maneuvering from those who arrive later in the conquered lands.  The leader is eventually assassinated by the sons of a defeated rival.

The final line of the story reads "Thus died Francisco Pizarro, conqueror of Peru."

Epilogue
Far from being a pulp yarn, the story is revealed to be an account of actual history, albeit one carefully mis-told.  Having pulled off his deception, the author explains at length how not one word of the story was actually untrue.  Nothing was described as being anything but what it was,  although it was done in such a way as to invite the reader to imagine something else.  "Universal Assembly" is simply a literal translation of Ekklesia Katholikos, or the "Catholic Church." The "power metal" which drove the Golden Empire was gold-197, because that is the only naturally occurring isotope of gold, and the "power" it brought was economic and political. The ships were never described as flying,  and indeed the author did write that they "were not suited to atmospheric navigation".  He protests that he had to abandon his intended last words for the leader ("I'm going to Heaven, and you, you bastards, can go to Hell!") in favor of Pizarro's actual last utterance, which was recorded as being "Jesus!" after he drew the sign of the cross in his own blood.

Being published in March, the story was, in effect, an early April Fools' Day prank.  It was re-published in collections of Randall Garrett's works, and an anthology entitled Analog's Lighter Side edited by Stanley Schmidt.

External links
 
 
 

1959 short stories
Science fiction short stories
Short stories by Randall Garrett
Works originally published in Analog Science Fiction and Fact